The Wasserbillig Aquarium is located in Wasserbillig, a small town in the south west of Luxembourg on the German border. Among the more exotic varieties are angelfish, neon tetra, the colourful Japanese koi and percidae from South America. But there are also species from closer to home, including eel, bream, gudgeon, asp, tench and zander.

Set on a hill overlooking the River Sauer, the aquarium also has a restaurant and a children's playground. It is open from 10 am to 5 pm every day from Easter until the end of September, the rest of the year it is open only on Fridays, Saturdays and Sundays.

References

External links
 

Mertert
Tourist attractions in Luxembourg
Aquaria in Luxembourg